Octav Botnar (October 21, 1913 – July 11, 1998) was a self-made businessman  who founded Datsun UK (later Nissan UK) and its associated car retail business Automotive Financial Group (AFG). He was a noted philanthropist.

Early life 
Botnar was born in Chernivtsi, which was then called Czernowitz and was in Austria-Hungary. During his childhood, in 1918, Austria-Hungary was dissolved and the town was renamed Cernăuţi and became part of Romania. The town is still called Cernăuţi but is now in Ukraine.

Botnar spent 1932 to 1936 in prison. Afterwards, he moved to France, where he joined the French Resistance and fought against the Nazis in World War II. He returned to Romania in 1946, where he remained until 1960. In 1966, he fled Communist Eastern Europe and ended up in Worthing in England, where he founded Datsun UK (now Nissan UK) in 1970.

Datsun and Nissan UK 
Botnar had originally run the UK import business for the German manufacturer NSU, however this business was dissolved when NSU was taken over by Volkswagen in 1969  (ultimately becoming Audi), and Botnar was looking for a new venture.  He successfully became the UK franchisee and importer for Nissan, and its Datsun range of cars.   Under Botnar's leadership, Datsun had become one of the biggest car imports in Britain, outselling not only its arch Japanese rival Toyota but eventually became the most popular foreign brand in the UK.  At its peak,  Botnar owned more than 200 Nissan dealerships throughout the country and was considered one of Britain's wealthiest men.

Philanthropy 
Octav's only child, Camelia Botnar, was killed in a car crash near Stonehenge in 1972 at the age of 20. Her death led to a wave of philanthropy that saw Botnar donate millions to charity throughout his later life. One of his larger donations was  £13 million to London's Great Ormond Street Hospital.

He also established the Camelia Botnar Foundation in his daughter's memory. The foundation, located in West Sussex, is still active today, providing residential training and work experience, helping young people to learn a skilled trade, embark on a useful career path and successfully make their own way in life.

Tax controversy 
In June 1991, the Inland Revenue raided Nissan UK's headquarters, as well as Mr Botnar's home and the homes of other company officials. The tax authority accused Botnar of evading more than £200 million in taxes. Botnar left for Switzerland and lived for the rest of his life there in Villars-sur-Ollon.

The Nissan UK and AFG businesses subsequently foundered, after Nissan took its UK distribution and import activities completely in-house in 1991.

Although Botnar maintained his innocence up until his final hours, he had agreed to pay £59 million to settle the case. Following settling, he opened a suit against the Inland Revenue for damages and malicious prosecution. At the time he said: "The damages I am seeking are only token, but I want to clear my name. I want my day in court."

Death 
Botnar spent his last years as a tax exile in Switzerland fighting the British Inland Revenue.

He died on 11 July 1998 at the age of 84 after suffering from stomach cancer. He is buried in Passy Cemetery in Paris. Tory party chairman Lord Parkinson once described Botnar as "truly one of our greatest philanthropists".

References

Further reading
 

1913 births
1998 deaths
Businesspeople from Chernivtsi
People from the Duchy of Bukovina
Romanian Jews
Bukovina Jews
20th-century Romanian businesspeople
British billionaires
Romanian emigrants to the United Kingdom
British people of Romanian-Jewish descent
20th-century British businesspeople